"Levi High" is a song by Dominican-American singer and rapper DaniLeigh featuring fellow American rapper DaBaby.  The song was released on March 16, 2020, marking the second collaboration between the two following the former's choreography work on the latter's "Bop" music video.

Background and composition
Prior to the song's release, DaniLeigh teased the single on her Instagram account, inviting fans to take part in the "#levihighchallenge".  The song is a reference to Levi denim jeans.

Music video
The single was released alongside a music video directed by Kat Webber.  The video portrays the two artists as a "Bonnie and Clyde" duo that pull off a heist.  A behind-the-scenes video was released on March 18, 2020.

Charts

Release history

References

2020 singles
DaBaby songs
Songs written by DaBaby

Song recordings produced by Take a Daytrip